Sazovo (Haź) is a rural locality (a village) in Krasnokholmsky Selsoviet, Kaltasinsky District, Bashkortostan, Russia. The population was 549 as of 2010. There are 11 streets.

Geography 
Sazovo is located 18 km east of Kaltasy (the district's administrative centre) by road. Kiyebak is the nearest rural locality.

References 

Rural localities in Kaltasinsky District